Liv Kristine Espenæs (born 14 February 1976) is a Norwegian singer who has performed and composed songs mostly for various subgenres of heavy metal music. She started her career in the music industry as a vocalist for the gothic metal band Theatre of Tragedy, and is the former lead vocalist for the symphonic metal band Leaves' Eyes. She is known for her work in close association with her then-husband and leader of the German band Atrocity, Alexander Krull. Currently she is a singer of a German band Midnattsol alongside her younger sister Carmen Elise Espenæs. She also released a number of solo albums in various genres.

Career
Kristine was born in Stavanger, and joined the Norwegian gothic metal band Theatre of Tragedy in 1994 as a backup singer, but was soon sharing lead vocals duties with Raymond István Rohonyi. She was fired from Theatre of Tragedy in 2003, a fact she learned about via an e-mail. She had been living in Germany since 1996 and collaborating with the death metal band Atrocity, whose singer Alexander Krull she married on 3 July 2003. With the five musicians from Atrocity she formed a new band, Leaves' Eyes, in August 2003. She has also released five solo albums, the most recent of which was released in October 2014 through Napalm Records.

Kristine has a soprano vocal range.

In 2005, Kristine was nominated for a Grammy award with Cradle of Filth for the song "Nymphetamine".

In 2016, she joined Eluveitie as a session vocalist for a couple of their live shows after the departure of their singer Anna Murphy.

On 16 April 2016, Leaves' Eyes stated that Kristine, who formed and had the idea of the band project, was no longer the singer of the band.

In December 2017 it was announced that Kristine joined her sister Carmen's band Midnattsol. She was originally announced to be a guest on their new album but after some discussions, the band picked her up as a permanent member.

Personal life
On 3 July 2003, Kristine married Atrocity vocalist Alexander Krull. They have a son, Leon Alexander. Kristine and her husband split-up in early January 2016. She married Michael Hansen, in June 2021.

Her younger sister, Carmen Elise Espenæs, is the vocalist of the German symphonic/folk metal band Midnattsol and of the Norwegian gothic/folk metal band Savn.

Contributions to music

Kristine helped to pioneer the beauty and the beast vocals approach, later used by many other successful bands such as Tristania, After Forever, Epica and Within Temptation in their beginnings. The term "beauty and the beast" refers to an aesthetic contrasting "angelic" female vocals with male growls or aggressive singing. Paradise Lost and The Gathering had already made use of this technique on some songs from their earlier albums but it was the Norwegian Theatre of Tragedy, Kristine's former band, that first released an entire album devoted to this approach with their self-titled debut in 1995.

A second album Velvet Darkness They Fear arrived in the following year. Theatre of Tragedy's third album Aégis in 1998 saw the band "venturing into fresh musical territory". The piano was replaced by electronic keyboards while Raymond Rohonyi opted to discard his death growls in favor of a "soft, spoken, sometimes whispering voice". The music was more clean and soft, "stripped of guitar harshness" but with a "near flawless execution" that "prompted many European critics to award Aégis perfect review scores".

For over a decade, this beauty and the beast aesthetic has flourished with many representatives across the European continent. Cradle of Filth has also been known to make use of this approach through guest female vocalists such as Kristine and Sarah Jezebel Deva.

Discography

Solo
Studio albums;
Deus Ex Machina (1998)
Enter My Religion (2006)
Skintight (2010)
Libertine (2012)
Vervain (2014)

Singles;
3am (1998)
Take Good Care (1998)
3am – "Fanedition (1998)
One Love (1999)
Fake a Smile (2006)
Over the Moon (2006)
Trapped in you Labyrinth (2006)
Skintight (2010)
Paris Paris (2012)
Love Decay (feat. Michelle Darkness) (2014)
Skylight (2019)
Gravity (2020)

EPs;
Fake a Smile (2006)
Have Courage Dear Heart (2021)

Live albums;
Liv(e) in Nagold 2019 (2021)

With Midnattsol
Studio albums;
The Aftermath (2018)

With Leaves' Eyes
Studio albums;
Lovelorn (2004)
Vinland Saga (2006)
Njord (2009)
Meredead (2011)
Symphonies of the Night (2013)
King of Kings (2015)

EPs;
Into Your Light (2004) 
Elegy (2005)
Legend Land (2006)
My Destiny (2009)
At Heaven's End (2010)
Melusine (2011)

With Theatre of Tragedy
Studio albums;
Theatre of Tragedy (1995)
Velvet Darkness They Fear (1996)
Aégis (1998)
Musique (2000)
Assembly (2002)

EPs;
A Rose for the Dead (1997)
Inperspective (2001)

Live albums;
Closure: Live (2001)

Guest appearances
Atrocity – Werk 80 (1997) - (additional vocals)
Heavenwood – Swallow (1998) - (vocals on "Downcast") 
Atrocity & Silke Bischoff – "Blue Moon" (non-album single) (1998) - (additional vocals)
Atrocity – Non Plus Ultra (1999) - (additional vocals)
 WeltenBrand – Der Untergang von Trisona (1999) - vocals on "The Devil Gets the Profiteer"
Das Ich – Re-Laborat (2000) - vocals on "Des Satans neue Kleider" (Atrocity Remix)
Atrocity – Gemini (2000) - additional vocals
Atrocity – Thank You – A Tribute to The Sisters of Mercy (2000) - vocals on "More"
 Genius – A Rock Opera Part II (2004) - vocals on "To Be Free"
 Immortal Rites – Art of Devolution (2004) - vocals on "Mirror Reflections"
 Hortus Animae – The Lotus Eaters – Dead Can Dance Tribute (2004) - vocals on "Summoning of the Muse"
Cradle of Filth – Nymphetamine (2004) - vocals on "Nymphetamine"
Atrocity – Atlantis (2004) - additional vocals
 Umbra et Imago – Motus Animi (2005) - "Ein letztes Mal" (Leaves' Eyes Remix)
Delain – Lucidity (2006) - vocals on  "See Me in Shadow" and "Day for Ghosts"
Atrocity – Werk 80 II (2008) - additional vocals
 Doro Pesch – Fear No Evil (2009) - backing vocals on "Celebrate"
Legio Mortis – The Human Creation and The Devil's Contribution (2011) - vocals on "Life Denied"
 Bob Katsionis – Rest in Keys (2012) - vocals on "Rendez-Vous in the Sky"
Týr – Valkyrja (2013) - vocals on "The Lay of Our Love
Romanthica – Eterno (2013) - vocals on "Despierta"
Primal Fear – Delivering the Black (2014) - backing vocals on "Born with a Broken Heart"
Savn – Savn (2014) - vocals on "I Am Free"
 Emerald Sun – Metal Dome (2015) - vocals on "Call of Nature"
Cradle of Filth – Cryptoriana – The Seductiveness of Decay (2017) - vocals on "Vengeful Spirit"
 Orden Ogan – Gunmen (2017) - vocals on "Come With Me to the Other Side"
Lux in Tenebris – To A New Eternity (2018) - additional vocals on "The Grand Design"
Ben Blutzukker - Queen of the Nite (2019) - additional vocals on "Queen of the Nite"
 Myrkgand - Old Mystical Tales (2019) - vocals on "Chthonian Cyclops"
Mortemia - The Pandemic Pandemonium Sessions (2021) - vocals on "Decadence Deepens Within"
 Tales of a Sleeping Giant (2022) - vocals on "Summer's End", "Lost in Emptiness", "Morgana"

References

External links

French homepage of Liv Kristine

1976 births
Women heavy metal singers
Living people
Norwegian women singers
Norwegian heavy metal singers
Norwegian pop singers
Norwegian rock singers
Norwegian singer-songwriters
Norwegian sopranos
Norwegian expatriates in Germany
Musicians from Stavanger
Napalm Records artists
Theatre of Tragedy members
Leaves' Eyes members
Women in metal